The United States Patent and Trademark Office (USPTO) is an agency in the U.S. Department of Commerce that serves as the national patent office and trademark registration authority for the United States. The USPTO's headquarters are in Alexandria, Virginia, after a 2005 move from the Crystal City area of neighboring Arlington, Virginia.

The USPTO is "unique among federal agencies because it operates solely on fees collected by its users, and not on taxpayer dollars". Its "operating structure is like a business in that it receives requests for services—applications for patents and trademark registrations—and charges fees projected to cover the cost of performing the services [it] provide[s]".

The Office is headed by the Under Secretary of Commerce for Intellectual Property and Director of the United States Patent and Trademark Office, a position last held by Andrei Iancu until he left office on January 20, 2021.  Commissioner of Patents Drew Hirshfeld is performing the functions of the Under Secretary and Director in the absence of an appointment or nomination to the positions.

The USPTO cooperates with the European Patent Office (EPO) and the Japan Patent Office (JPO) as one of the Trilateral Patent Offices. The USPTO is also a Receiving Office, an International Searching Authority and an International Preliminary Examination Authority for international patent applications filed in accordance with the Patent Cooperation Treaty.

Mission
The legal basis for the United States patent system is the Copyright Clause in Section 8 of Article I of the U.S. Constitution, which gives Congress the power to grant patents and copyrights on a national basis.

The Congress shall have Power ... To promote the Progress of Science and useful Arts, by securing for limited Times to Authors and Inventors the exclusive Right to their respective Writings and Discoveries.
The USPTO maintains a permanent, interdisciplinary historical record of all U.S. patent applications in order to fulfill objectives outlined in the United States Constitution. The PTO's mission is to promote "industrial and technological progress in the United States and strengthen the national economy" by:
 Administering the laws relating to patents and trademarks;
 Advising the Secretary of Commerce, the President of the United States, and the administration on patent, trademark, and copyright protection; and
 Providing advice on the trade-related aspects of intellectual property.

Structure

The USPTO is headquartered at the Alexandria Campus, consisting of 11 buildings in a city-like development surrounded by ground floor retail and high rise residential buildings between the Metro stations of King Street station (the main search building is two blocks due south of the King Street station) and Eisenhower Avenue station where the actual Alexandria Campus is located between Duke Street (on the North) to Eisenhower Avenue (on the South), and between John Carlyle Street (on the East) to Elizabeth Lane (on the West) in Alexandria, Virginia. An additional building in Arlington, Virginia, was opened in 2009.

The USPTO was expected by 2014 to open its first ever satellite offices in Detroit, Dallas, Denver, and Silicon Valley to reduce backlog and reflect regional industrial strengths. The first satellite office opened in Detroit on July 13, 2012. In 2013, due to the budget sequestration, the satellite office for Silicon Valley, which is home to one of the nation's top patent-producing cities, was put on hold. However, renovation and infrastructure updates continued after the sequestration, and the Silicon Valley location opened in the San Jose City Hall in 2015.

, the end of the U.S. government's fiscal year, the PTO had 9,716 employees, nearly all of whom are based at its five-building headquarters complex in Alexandria. Of those, 6,242 were patent examiners (almost all of whom were assigned to examine utility patents; only 99 were assigned to examine design patents) and 388 were trademark examining attorneys; the rest are support staff. While the agency has noticeably grown in recent years, the rate of growth was far slower in fiscal 2009 than in the recent past; this is borne out by data from fiscal 2005 to the present: As of the end of FY 2018,  the USPTO was composed of 12,579 federal employees, including 8,185 patent examiners, 579 trademark examiners, and 3,815 other staff.

Patent examiners make up the bulk of the employees at USPTO. They hold degrees in various scientific disciplines, but do not necessarily hold law degrees. Unlike patent examiners, trademark examiners must be licensed attorneys.

All examiners work under a strict, "count"-based production system. For every application, "counts" are earned by composing, filing, and mailing a first office action on the merits, and upon disposal of an application.

The Commissioner for Patents oversees three main bodies, headed by former Deputy Commissioner for Patent Operations, currently Peggy Focarino, the Deputy Commissioner for Patent Examination Policy, currently Andrew Hirshfeld as Acting Deputy, and finally the Commissioner for Patent Resources and Planning, which is currently vacant. The Patent Operations of the office is divided into nine different technology centers that deal with various arts.

Prior to 2012, decisions of patent examiners could be appealed to the Board of Patent Appeals and Interferences, an administrative law body of the USPTO. Decisions of the BPAI could further be appealed to the United States Court of Appeals for the Federal Circuit, or a civil suit could be brought against the Commissioner of Patents in the United States District Court for the Eastern District of Virginia. The United States Supreme Court may ultimately decide on a patent case. Under the America Invents Act, the BPAI was converted to the Patent Trial and Appeal Board or "PTAB".

Similarly, decisions of trademark examiners may be appealed to the Trademark Trial and Appeal Board, with subsequent appeals directed to the Federal Circuit, or a civil action may also be brought.

In recent years, the USPTO has seen increasing delays between when a patent application is filed and when it issues. To address its workload challenges, the USPTO has undertaken an aggressive program of hiring and recruitment. The USPTO hired 1,193 new patent examiners in Fiscal Year 2006 (year ending September 30, 2006), 1,215 new examiners in fiscal 2007, and 1,211 in fiscal year 2008. The USPTO expected to continue hiring patent examiners at a rate of approximately 1,200 per year through 2012; however, due to a slowdown in new application filings since the onset of the late-2000s economic crisis, and projections of substantial declines in maintenance fees in coming years, the agency imposed a hiring freeze in early March 2009.

In 2006, USPTO instituted a new training program for patent examiners called the "Patent Training Academy". It is an eight-month program designed to teach new patent examiners the fundamentals of patent law, practice and examination procedure in a college-style environment. Because of the impending USPTO budget crisis previously alluded to, it had been rumored that the Academy would be closed by the end of 2009. Focarino, then Acting Commissioner for Patents, denied in a May 2009 interview that the Academy was being shut down, but stated that it would be cut back because the hiring goal for new examiners in fiscal 2009 was reduced to 600. Ultimately, 588 new patent examiners were hired in fiscal year 2009.

In 2016, the USPTO partnered with the Girl Scouts of the USA to create an "Intellectual Property Patch" merit badge, which is awarded to Girl Scouts at four different levels.

Management
In October 2021, President Joe Biden nominated attorney Kathi Vidal to serve as the USPTO director. She was sworn in on April 13, 2022.

Fee diversion
For many years, Congress has "diverted" about 10% of the fees that the USPTO collected into the general treasury of the United States.  In effect, this took money collected from the patent system to use for the general budget. This fee diversion has been generally opposed by patent practitioners (e.g., patent attorneys and patent agents), inventors, the USPTO, as well as former federal judge Paul R. Michel. These stakeholders would rather use the funds to improve the patent office and patent system, such as by implementing the USPTO's 21st Century Strategic Plan. The last six annual budgets of the George W. Bush administration did not propose to divert any USPTO fees, and the first budget of the Barack Obama administration continued this practice, as well as the second budget of the Trump administration; however, stakeholders continue to press for a permanent end to fee diversion.

The discussion of which party can appropriate the fees is more than a financial question. Patent fees represent a policy lever that influences both the number of applications submitted to the office as well as their quality.

Patents

 On July 31, 1790, the first U.S. patent was issued to Samuel Hopkins for an improvement "in the making of Pot ash and Pearl ash by a new Apparatus and Process". This patent was signed by then-President George Washington.
 The X-Patents (the first 9,957 (approximately), issued between 1790 and 1836) were destroyed by a fire; fewer than 3,000 of those have been recovered and re-issued with numbers that include an "X". The X generally appears at the end of the numbers hand-written on full-page patent images; however, in patent collections and for search purposes, the X is considered to be the patent type – analogous to the "D" of design patents – and appears at the beginning of the number.  The X distinguishes the patents from those issued after the fire, which began again with patent number 1.
 Each year, the PTO issues over 150,000 patents to companies and individuals worldwide. , the PTO has granted 8,743,423 patents and has received 16,020,302 applications.
 On June 19, 2018, the 10 millionth U.S. patent was issued to Joseph Marron for invention of a "Coherent LADAR [System] Using Intra-Pixel Quadrature Detection" to improve laser detection and ranging (LADAR). The patent was the first to receive the newly redesigned patent cover. It was signed by then-President Donald Trump during a special ceremony at the Oval Office.

Trademarks
The USPTO examines applications for trademark registration, which can be filed under five different filing bases: use in commerce, intent to use, foreign application, foreign registration, or international registration. If approved, the trademarks are registered on either the Principal Register or the Supplemental Register, depending upon whether the mark meets the appropriate distinctiveness criteria. This federal system governs goods and services distributed via interstate commerce, and operates alongside state level trademark registration systems.

Trademark applications have grown substantially in recent years, jumping from 296,490 new applications in 2000, to 345,000 new applications in 2014, to 458,103 new applications in 2018. Recent growth has been driven partially by growing numbers of trademark applications originating in China; trademark applications from China have grown more than 12-fold since 2013, and in 2017, one in every nine trademark applications reviewed by the U.S. Trademark Office originated in China.

Since 2008, the Trademark Office has hosted a National Trademark Expo every two years, billing it as "a free, family-friendly event designed to educate the public about trademarks and their importance in the global marketplace." The Expo features celebrity speakers such as Anson Williams (of the television show Happy Days) and basketball player Kareem Abdul-Jabbar and has numerous trademark-holding companies as exhibitors. Before the 2009 National Trademark Expo, the Trademark Office designed and launched a kid-friendly trademark mascot known as T. Markey, who appears as an anthropomorphized registered trademark symbol. T. Markey is featured prominently on the Kids section of the USPTO website, alongside fellow IP mascots Ms. Pat Pending (with her robot cat GeaRS) and Mark Trademan.

In 2020, trademark applications marked the sharpest declines and inclines in American history. During the spring, COVID-19 lockdowns led to reduced filings, which then increased in July 2020 to exceed the previous year. August 2020 was subsequently the highest month of trademark filings in the history of the U.S. Patent and Trademark Office.

Representation
The USPTO only allows certain qualified persons to practice before the USPTO. Practice includes filing of patent and trademark applications on behalf of individuals and companies, prosecuting the patent and trademark applications, and participating in administrative appeals and other proceedings before the PTO examiners, examining attorneys and boards. The USPTO sets its own standards for who may practice. Any person who practices patent law before the USPTO must become a registered patent attorney or agent. A patent agent is a person who has passed the USPTO registration examination (the "patent bar") but has not passed any state bar exam to become a licensed attorney; a patent attorney is a person who has passed both a state bar and the patent bar and is in good standing as an attorney.  A patent agent can only act in a representative capacity in patent matters presented to the USPTO, and may not represent a patent holder or applicant in a court of law.  To be eligible for taking the patent bar exam, a candidate must possess a degree in "engineering or physical science or the equivalent of such a degree". Any person who practices trademark law before the USPTO must be an active member in good standing of the highest court of any state.

The United States allows any citizen from any country to sit for the patent bar (if he/she has the requisite technical background). Only Canada has a reciprocity agreement with the United States that confers upon a patent agent similar rights.

An unrepresented inventor may file a patent application and prosecute it on his or her own behalf (pro se). If it appears to a patent examiner that an inventor filing a pro se application is not familiar with the proper procedures of the Patent Office, the examiner may suggest that the filing party obtain representation by a registered patent attorney or patent agent. The patent examiner cannot recommend a specific attorney or agent, but the Patent Office does post a list of those who are registered.

While the inventor of a relatively simple-to-describe invention may well be able to produce an adequate specification and detailed drawings, there remains language complexity in what is claimed, either in the particular claim language of a utility application, or in the manner in which drawings are presented in a design application. There is also skill required when searching for prior art that is used to support the application and to prevent applying for a patent for something that may be unpatentable. A patent examiner will make special efforts to help pro se inventors understand the process but the failure to adequately understand or respond to an Office action from the USPTO can endanger the inventor's rights, and may lead to abandonment of the application.

Electronic filing system
The USPTO accepts patent applications filed in electronic form. Inventors or their patent agents/attorneys can file applications as Adobe PDF documents. Filing fees can be paid by credit card or by a USPTO "deposit account".

Patent search tools

The USPTO web site provides free electronic copies of issued patents and patent applications as multiple-page TIFF (graphic) documents. The site also provides Boolean search and analysis tools.

The USPTO's free distribution service only distributes the patent documents as a set of TIFF files.  Numerous free and commercial services provide patent documents in other formats, such as Adobe PDF and CPC.

Criticisms 

The USPTO has been criticized for granting patents for impossible or absurd, already known, or arguably obvious inventions. Economists have documented that, although the USPTO makes mistakes when granting patents, these mistakes might be less prominent than some might believe.

Controversial patents

, "Method of exercising a cat",  covers having a cat chase the beam from a laser pointer. The patent has been criticized as being obvious.
, "Sealed crustless sandwich", issued in 1999, covers the design of a sandwich with crimped edges. However, all claims of the patent were subsequently canceled by the PTO upon reexamination.
, "Hyper-light-speed antenna", an antenna that sends signals faster than the speed of light. According to the description in the patent, "The present invention takes a transmission of energy, and instead of sending it through normal time and space, it pokes a small hole into another dimension, thus, sending the energy through a place which allows transmission of energy to exceed the speed of light."
, "Method of swinging on a swing", issued April 9, 2002, was granted to a seven-year-old boy, whose father, a patent attorney, wanted to demonstrate how the patent system worked to his son who was five years old at the time of the application. The PTO initially rejected it due to prior art, but eventually issued the patent. However, all claims of the patent were subsequently canceled by the PTO upon reexamination.
, "Space vehicle propelled by the pressure of inflationary vacuum state", describes an anti-gravity device. In November 2005, the USPTO was criticized by physicists for granting it. The journal Nature first highlighted this patent issued for a device that presumably amounts to a perpetual motion machine, defying the laws of physics. The device comprises a particular electrically superconducting shield and electromagnetic generating device.  The examiner allowed the claims because the design of the shield and device was novel and not obvious. In situations such as this where a substantial question of patentability is raised after a patent is issued, the Commissioner of the Patent Office can order a reexamination of the patent.

Controversial trademarks
 , "Cloud Computing" for Dell, covering "custom manufacture of computer hardware for use in data centers and mega-scale computing environments for others", was allowed by a trademark attorney on July 8, 2008. Cloud computing is a generic term that could define technology infrastructure for years to come, which had been in general use at the time of the application. The application was rejected on August 12, 2008, as descriptive and generic.
 , "Netbook" for Psion, covering "laptop computers" was registered on November 21, 2000. Although the company discontinued the netBook line in November 2003 and allowed the trademark to become genericized through use by journalists and vendors (products marketed as 'netbooks' include the Dell Inspiron Mini Series, Asus eeePC, HP Mini 1000, MSI Wind Netbook and others), USPTO subsequently rejected a number of trademarks citing a "likelihood of confusion" under section 2(d), including 'G NETBOOK' ( rejected October 31, 2008), MSI's 'WIND NETBOOK' and Coby Electronics' 'COBY NETBOOK' rejected January 13, 2009. Psion also delivered a batch of cease-and-desist letters on December 23, 2008, relating to the genericized trademark.

Slow patent examination and backlog

The USPTO has been criticized for taking an inordinate amount of time in examining patent applications. This is particularly true in the fast-growing area of business method patents.  As of 2005, patent examiners in the business method area were still examining patent applications filed in 2001.

The delay was attributed by spokesmen for the Patent Office to a combination of a sudden increase in business method patent filings after the 1998 State Street Bank decision, the unfamiliarity of patent examiners with the business and financial arts (e.g., banking, insurance, stock trading etc.), and the issuance of a number of controversial patents (e.g.,  "Amazon one click patent") in the business method area.

Effective August 2006, the USPTO introduced an accelerated patent examination procedure in an effort to allow inventors a speedy evaluation of an application with a final disposition within twelve months. The procedure requires additional information to be submitted with the application and also includes an interview with the examiner. The first accelerated patent was granted on March 15, 2007, with a six-month issuance time.

As of the end of 2008, there were 1,208,076 patent applications pending at the Patent Office.  At the end of 1997, the number of applications pending was 275,295. Therefore, over those eleven years there was a 439% increase in the number of pending applications.

December 2012 data showed that there was 597,579 unexamined patent applications in the backlog. During the four years since 2009, more than a 50% reduction was achieved. First action pendency was reported as 19.2 months.

Fraud by remote working employees
In 2012, the USPTO initiated an internal investigation into allegations of fraud by employees taking advantage of its remote work policies. Investigators discovered that some patent examiners had lied about the hours they had worked, but high level officials prevented access to computer records, thus limiting the number of employees who could be punished.

See also

Confederate Patent Office
Criticism of the United States government § Criticism of agencies
Electronic Filing System (USPTO)
Ex Parte Quayle
Google Patents
John Ruggles
Invention Secrecy Act
NASA spinoff
National Inventors Hall of Fame
Office of Independent Inventor Programs (1999)
Old Patent Office Building
Patent Application Information Retrieval (PAIR)
Patent Model
Patent Office
Patent Office Professional Association (POPA)
Science and technology in the United States
Technological history of the United States
Timeline of United States discoveries
Timeline of United States inventions
Yankee ingenuity
1836 U.S. Patent Office fire
1877 U.S. Patent Office fire

References

Further reading
  .

External links

 
 USPTO in the Federal Register
 Searches (USPTO)
 Trademark Applications and Registrations Retrieval (TARR) search by trademark serial number or registration number (USPTO)
 Office of Enrollment & Discipline (OED) 
 Patent and Trademark Depository Library Program
 Stopfakes.gov Small Business Resources 
 Patent Full-Text and Full-Page Image Databases (USPTO)
 
 

 
Patent offices
Intellectual property organizations
United States trademark law
Agencies of the United States government
Patent and Trademark Office
Patent and Trademark Office
International Searching and Preliminary Examining Authorities